Antony Stuart Hansen  Southampton, Hampshire, United Kingdom) is an English actor, singer and songwriter who is best known for his roles in London's West End.

Career
Antony Hansen trained at Mountview Academy of Theatre Arts in London, and was the youngest finalist on BBC One's search for Joseph Any Dream Will Do.  Since leaving the show he has made his way onto the West End stage in shows such as The Phantom of The Opera, Wicked and most recently, Les Misérables.

Credits

Television

Concerts

Theatre

References

1989 births
Living people
English male stage actors
Male actors from Southampton
English male television actors